Kevin James Pirrie (16 February 1922 – 9 January 2006) was an Australian rules footballer who played with Hawthorn in the Victorian Football League (VFL).

Family
He was the son of Richard Pirrie and brother of Dick Pirrie.

War service
Pirrie's football career was interrupted by his service in the Australian Army during World War II.

Notes

External links 

1922 births
2006 deaths
Australian rules footballers from Melbourne
Hawthorn Football Club players
People from Hawthorn, Victoria
Australian Army personnel of World War II
Military personnel from Melbourne